Araku Valley Assembly constituency is an ST reserved constituency in Alluri Sitharama Raju district of Andhra Pradesh, representing the state legislative assembly in India. It is one of the seven assembly segments of Araku (ST) (Lok Sabha constituency), along with Kurupam (ST), Palakonda, Salur, Paderu (ST) and Rampachodavaram. Chetti Palguna is the present MLA of the constituency, who won the 2019 Andhra Pradesh Legislative Assembly election from Yuvajana Sramika Rythu Congress Party. In 2019, there were a total of 220,773 electors in the constituency.

Mandals 
The six mandals that form the assembly constituency are:

Members of Legislative Assembly

Election results

Assembly Elections 2009

Assembly elections 2014

Assembly elections 2019

See also 
 List of constituencies of the Andhra Pradesh Legislative Assembly

References 

Assembly constituencies of Andhra Pradesh